Amanita brunneolocularis, also known as the Mesoamerican dark volva blusher, is an uncommon species of Amanita.

Taxonomy 
Specimens were found in September 2006 in North Carolina. It was originally thought to be some variety of Amanita rubescens. This was later found to be false, and that this was a complete different species. This new species was named Amanita brunneolocularis.

References

External links
 
 

brunneolocularis
Fungi of North America
Fungi of Central America
Fungi described in 1992